Kranich’s Jewelers is a fourth generation family-owned jewelry company with locations in Altoona, State College and Johnstown, Pennsylvania.

History
Kranich’s Jewelers was established in York, Pennsylvania.  The company was long thought to have started in 1903, but it was eventually discovered that the roots of this family jewelry business began in 1891.  The company was once called Kranich Brothers Jewelers.  The Kranich Brothers had stores in York, Lancaster and Altoona, Pennsylvania as well as one in Worcester, Massachusetts.

The Altoona location opened in 1923.  This store was operated and expanded by Charles and Mildred Kranich, who were joined in business by their son Michael in 1962.  In 1976, a location was opened at State College, Pennsylvania – the home of Penn State University.  A Johnstown, Pennsylvania location was opened in 2000.  

Michael was joined in business by his son Charles in 1991 and his son Michael in 1996.  Charles and Michael now serve as Co-Presidents of the company.   Through the years Kranich’s Jewelers locations initially transitioned from downtown locations to shopping malls.  Today, all of their stores are in free-standing locations.  The corporate offices of the company are located at the Plank Road location in Altoona.  The other locations are on North Atherton Street in State College and on Scalp Avenue in Johnstown.

Products and services
Kranich’s specialize in Fine Jewelry and Timepieces and are proud to represent some of the best jewelry designers and watch brands including Rolex.  Each of Kranich’s Jewelers luxurious stores feature professional jewelry repair services.  In addition to their free-standing stores, Kranich’s Jewelers have an active online presence and serve customers internationally.

Milestones
Kranich’s Jewelers has been named one of Central Pennsylvania’s leading businesses by Pennsylvania Business Central magazine.  Kranich’s has also been recognized in their industry for being one of the oldest family-owned jewelry companies in the United States.  Kranich’s Jewelers and their owners are active in many charitable and civic organizations that benefit the communities of Central Pennsylvania.

Gallery

References

Companies based in Blair County, Pennsylvania
American companies established in 1903
Retail companies established in 1903
Jewelry retailers of the United States
Privately held companies based in Pennsylvania
1903 establishments in Pennsylvania